"Think About It" is a song by British record producer Naughty Boy, featuring vocals from American rapper Wiz Khalifa and English singer Ella Eyre. It was released on 17 November 2013 as the fourth single from Naughty Boy's debut album, Hotel Cabana. The song entered the UK Singles Chart at number 80 and climbed to number 78 on the second week. It premiered on MistaJam's BBC Radio 1Xtra show on 14 August 2013. A remix by Wilkinson was given the title of Zane Lowe's Hottest Record in the World. It is featured in the soundtrack to the 2014 film Vampire Academy. The music video was released on 29 October 2013.

Track listing

Charts

Release history

References

2013 songs
2013 singles
Hip hop songs
Naughty Boy songs
Wiz Khalifa songs
Ella Eyre songs
Song recordings produced by Mojam
Songs written by Mustafa Omer
Songs written by Naughty Boy
Songs written by Wiz Khalifa
Virgin EMI Records singles
Songs written by Andrea Martin (musician)